Mohammad Rashid Mazaheri (born 18 May 1989) is an Iranian footballer who plays for Iranian club Paykan as a goalkeeper. He is a member of the Iranian national team.

Club career
Mazaheri spent seven years in the youth academy of Fajr Sepasi before joining the youth teams of Esteghlal Ahvaz in 2009. He started his senior career with Esteghlal Ahvaz in 2010. Previously, he played for the Moghavemat Sepasi youth team.

Zob Ahan
Mazaheri joined Zob Ahan midway through the 2013–14 season, mainly featuring as a reserve. He earned his starting place in the 2014–15 season and won the Hazfi Cup. Mazaheri lead Zob Ahan to the Round of 16 of the 2016 AFC Champions League as the first placed team in their group.
In the 2018 AFC Champions League, he scored the highest goal keeper at the top of the list for the best goalkeeper this season.

Tractor S.C.
On 8 June 2019, Mazaheri signed a 4 years contract with Tractor in the Iran Pro League.

International career
Mazaheri started his career with the national team playing for Iran U-20 team. He played for the Iran U-23, and participated in the 2010 Asian Games in Guangzhou, China. In May 2018 he was named in Iran's preliminary squad for the 2018 World Cup in Russia.

Personal life
In 2011, prior to his departure to Kyrgyzstan to participate in Football at the 2012 Summer Olympics – Men's Asian Qualifiers Preliminary Round 1, Mazaheri was involved in an altercation outside his house in Ahvaz. While reports vary, reports state that Mazaheri was physically assaulted and the windows to his house were broken. It was reported in Iranian newspapers in July 2011 that Mehdi Rahmati, Iranian international, asked as one of his conditions on joining Persepolis that "Esteghlal Ahvaz goalie" be signed as his reserve. It is widely speculated that the goalie mentioned was Mazaheri, since they both got their start in Fajr Sepasi youth ranks.

Career statistics

Club

International
Statistics accurate as of match played 15 June 2018.

Honours

Club
Zob Ahan
Hazfi Cup: 2014–15, 2015–16
Iranian Super Cup: 2016

Tractor
Hazfi Cup: 2019–20

Individual 
Awards

 Fans' Asian Champions League XI: 2016

References

External links
Persian League Profile

1989 births
Living people
Iranian footballers
Esteghlal Ahvaz players
Foolad FC players
Zob Ahan Esfahan F.C. players
Persian Gulf Pro League players
Azadegan League players
Iran under-20 international footballers
People from Kohgiluyeh and Boyer-Ahmad Province
Lur people
Association football goalkeepers
Footballers at the 2010 Asian Games
2018 FIFA World Cup players
Iran international footballers
Asian Games competitors for Iran
Tractor S.C. players
Esteghlal F.C. players